Resuttano (Sicilian: Rastanu) is a comune (municipality) in the Province of Caltanissetta in the Italian region of Sicily, located about  southeast of Palermo and about  north of Caltanissetta.

Resuttano borders the following municipalities: Alimena, Blufi, Bompietro, Petralia Sottana, Santa Caterina Villarmosa.

History 
In 1337 Federico II d'Aragona (1272–1337), king of Sicily, stopped at Resuttano Castle to dictate his will there and caused the War of the Four Vicars between the Chiaramonte faction and the Ventimiglia faction.

Demographic evolution

References

External links
 www.comune.resuttano.cl.it/

Cities and towns in Sicily